Sorina is both a feminine Romanian given name and a surname. Notable people with the name include:

Given name
Florina Sorina Hulpan, a Romanian Olympics weightlifter
Sorina-Luminița Plăcintă, a Romanian engineer and politician
Sorina Nwachukwu, a German sprinter of Nigerian descent
Silvia Sorina Munteanu, a Romanian opera singer
Sorina Ștefârță, a journalist from the Republic of Moldova
Sorina Tîrcă, a Romanian handballer

Surname
Alexandra Sorina, a Belarusian actress
Arnold Sorina, a Vanuatuan Olympics middle-distance runner

See also
Sorin (disambiguation)

Romanian feminine given names